Dylan Dog: Dead of Night is a 2011 American action-horror-comedy film based on Tiziano Sclavi's Italian comic book Dylan Dog, starring Brandon Routh as the antagonisted eponymous and self-aware detective. The film was released in Italy on March 16, 2011, and in the United States on April 29, 2011. The film received negative reviews from critics and grossed just $5 million on a $20 million budget.

Plot

In New Orleans, Dylan Dog, an ace detective whose specialty is paranormal cases, narrates how he helped people with their cases until his wife, Cassandra, was killed by vampires. Since then he has been doing regular cases with his "partner", Marcus Deckler.

One night when Elizabeth Ryan calls her father without getting an answer, she goes to her father's room and finds him dead on the floor. She is then surprised, and almost attacked, by a strange hairy creature. The next day Dylan is informed by Marcus that Elizabeth asked for (and later hires) him. When Dylan interrogates her she explains that he is the only one who can help her; he shows him a card (his old detective card) that says "No pulse? No problem". Dylan sees it, stands up and goes out, stating that he doesn't "do that" any more, followed by Marcus.

That night Marcus is attacked and killed by an unknown creature (who Dylan thinks is the same creature that killed Elizabeth's father). Dylan decides to officially help Elizabeth with her case. He retrieves an old forensics kit from under the floorboards of his office and goes to Elizabeth's house. After finding a hair sample in the tree outside her father's study, he tells Elizabeth that the creature that killed her father is a female eighteen- to nineteen-year-old werewolf who is a member of the Cysnos werewolf clan. Dylan visits the Cysnos leader, Gabriel—an old friend of his—and realizes that Gabriel's 19-year-old daughter Mara might be his main suspect, an idea that makes Gabriel very angry. After he is told off by Gabriel, Dylan is attacked by Gabriel's older son Wolfgang who is then knocked unconscious by Dylan, using a silver gauntlet.

Dylan then finds Mara dead in a warehouse and is briefly attacked by an unknown vampire. He then goes to Elizabeth in order to determine what connections may exist between those involved. She shows him a book of artifacts her father imported and indicates that one of the items pictured is now missing after having been smuggled into the country. The same vampire from earlier attacks Dylan and Elizabeth at her home along with two others demanding "The Heart." Dylan fends them off long enough for them to make an escape and continue the investigation.

Dylan then goes to the morgue (which is run by zombies) to see Marcus's wound and discovers that Marcus has been turned into a zombie (and he also has a missing arm). Marcus initially doesn't believe Dylan, but finally accepts his condition after Dylan shoots him to prove it. Dylan then takes both Marcus and Elizabeth to "the body shop", which is a black market for body parts. While Marcus looks for a new arm, Dylan talks with the owner and is informed that the vampires, led by Vargas, are after an artifact known as "The heart". Dylan then goes to the Corpus House, a nightclub owned by Vargas. He talks to Vargas, an arrogant young vampire who denies being involved with the murders and tells Dylan to go while he still lets him to do so.

Dylan then visits his old vampire friend, Borelli. Borelli tells Dylan that the artifact known as "The heart" is called "The heart of Belial", a cross-like relic that holds the blood of Belial, an ancient monster who cannot be killed unless his/her master is destroyed. After he finds the heart in the tomb of vampire elder known as Sclavi, Dylan is ambushed by Vargas' men. After he awakens, Vargas traps him and Marcus inside the crypt, and takes the Heart. Before sealing the pair up, Vargas reveals that he was the one who killed Cassandra years ago, thus provoking Dylan to kill the vampire elders and leave Vargas in charge. After Marcus digs himself out and releases Dylan, the duo goes after Vargas who has taken Elizabeth to the Corpus House. Vargas reveals to Elizabeth that he intends to turn her into a vampire and inject the blood of Belial into her. Dylan enters the Corpus House and finds that both Vargas and Elizabeth are gone.

On his way to find Elizabeth and Vargas, Dylan realizes that Elizabeth is the real enemy and wants to turn Vargas into Belial as a revenge for her father's murder. She tells him that the reason is not revenge, instead she explains that her family - an organization of monster hunters - are the "good guys" and that the "monsters" (vampires, werewolves, zombies, etc.) must be destroyed. Dylan says that she is wrong and that she is the monster. She injects the blood into Vargas's body and escapes, but before she can do so she is attacked by Marcus who is knocked down by her. Dylan fights off Belial (who is slowly taking over Vargas's body) when Elizabeth tries to stop Belial from killing Dylan, claiming he should do as she says because she is its master. Belial states the anyone who stops him, including his master, is his enemy. After knocking her away, Belial continues after Dylan while Elizabeth escapes while Wolfgang (who was called by Dylan before the battle) and his werewolf allies attack Elizabeth. They manage to subdue and kill Elizabeth, and at the same time Belial dies in front of Dylan leaving Vargas's unconscious body. Dylan gives the heart to Wolfgang, the only one that Dylan can trust to protect it, and goes with Marcus.

Finally, Dylan decides to revive his paranormal detective agency. Using copies of the same card that Elizabeth gave him earlier, calling Marcus "partner"; something that Marcus had wanted for a long time.

Cast

Production
Screenwriters Thomas Dean Donnelly and Joshua Oppenheimer initially set the film up at Dimension Films in 1998. Oppenheimer lobbied for Breck Eisner to direct, having already produced his student short film Recon. The film was produced by independent film companies Platinum Studios and Hyde Park Entertainment, distributed by Freestyle Releasing, and directed by Kevin Munroe. It starred Brandon Routh, Sam Huntington, Anita Briem, Peter Stormare, and Taye Diggs. This was the second time Routh and Huntington co-starred in a film together, the previous film being Superman Returns.

Release
The world premiere took place on March 15.

Reception

Box office
Dylan Dog: Dead of Night grossed $1.2 million in the United States and Canada, and $4.6 million in other territories, for a worldwide total of $5.8 million, against a $20 million production budget.

Critical response
On review aggregate website Rotten Tomatoes, the film holds an approval rating of 7% based on 43 reviews, with an average rating of 3.43/10. The website's critics consensus called the film "an uninspired, feebly-acted horror/comedy that produces little scares and laughs."  On Metacritic, the film holds a weighted average score of 31 out of 100, based on 10 critics, indicating "generally unfavorable reviews".

Luca Raffaelli of la Repubblica, said "it's a good B-movie inspired by a great top-league European comic", and pointed out that the character of Brandon Routh "is hollow" while the original comic character "uses the horror to talk about modern society's problems". Roberto Castrogiovanni (www.Movieplayer.it) tries not to compare the movie to the original comic, but states that "not everything is perfect", and the biggest problem is "the original plot and the development of the screenplay": the plot is predictable, dialogues contain the usual stereotypes, and the main character is just the usual American action-man. Federica Aliano (www.Film.it) heavily criticized the movie, saying "it's far worse than any bad expectation", and highlighted the big difference with the original comic: "the mature feeling of Tiziano Sclavi's masterpiece could never be achieved by using splatter and beautiful images, but by using psychological introspection and by projecting into reality the nightmares and fears of characters and readers". Federico Gironi (Coming Soon Television) refers to the film without comparing it to the original comic, and notes many similarities with Underworld, Buffy the Vampire Slayer, and True Blood, which make the film "like baby food, good for an extremely young target [audience] without a deep critical edge", although the director "avoids disappointing the audience and gets a couple of good gags [in]".

The film was also negatively received by Marco Lucio Papaleo (www.Everyeye.it), who gave it an overall score of 5 out of 10: "Technically Dylan Dog: Dead of Night is not bad, and sometimes even interesting. But it is not Dylan Dog. And even if all the names were changed, it would just be a nice movie, but actually [one] already seen and useless."

See also
 Cemetery Man, another film based on a work by Tiziano Sclavi.

References

External links

 
 
 
 
 

2011 films
2011 action comedy films
2011 horror films
2010s comedy horror films
American action comedy films
American action horror films
American comedy horror films
2010s English-language films
Latin-language films
Films with screenplays by Thomas Dean Donnelly and Joshua Oppenheimer
Films based on Italian comics
Films directed by Kevin Munroe
Films shot in New Orleans
American supernatural horror films
Occult detective fiction
Vampire comedy films
Films scored by Klaus Badelt
Live-action films based on comics
2011 comedy films
Films produced by Gilbert Adler
2010s American films